Lobi Stars Football Club (formerly known as Mosquito football club, Lobi Bank, BBL Hawks, and Hawks) is a Nigerian professional soccer club based in Makurdi, Benue. The club competes in the Nigerian Professional Football League. The Stars' home is the 8,000 seater Aper Aku Stadium.

History
Founded as Hawks of Makurdi in 1981 by the Benue State sports council, the club was renamed Benue Breweries Limited (BBL) Hawks Football club, when the state-owned Breweries acquired the club in 1985.
There was another change again when state-owned Lobi Bank acquired the club in 1990 and named it Lobi Bank Football Club.

In 1999, the Nigeria Football League was played in a new format which saw the top four teams squaring up in a knock out Super League at the National Stadium, Surulere. Lobi Stars won the maiden edition of the Nigerian Super League under coach Godwin Koko Uwua's management. Lobi Stars won its first and only FA Cup title in 2003 after beating Sharks FC of Port-Harcourt.

In 2005 they reached the finals of the domestic FA Cup where they lost to Enyimba.

They finished the 2008–09 season with an official record of 13 wins 10 draws and 15 losses after winning a game on appeal against Enugu Rangers, avoiding the drop by one point.

In August 2009, the Benue State government announced the club will be leased to private ownership, ending direct support from the state, that never materialised. Lobi finished 3rd in Glo premier league in 2012. They also reached the Federation Cup final that season but lost to Heartland FC of Owerri.

Honours
Nigeria Professional Football League
Champions: 1999

Nigeria FA Cup
Winners: 2003

Nigeria Super Cup
Winners: 1999, 2018

Performance in CAF competitions
CAF Champions League
2000 – Group stage
2018–19 – Group stage

CAF Confederation Cup
2004 – Second round
2006 – Second round
2012 – First round

WAFU Club Championship
2010 – First round

Current squad
As of 21 September 2020

Coaching staff
Technical Advisor –  Eddy Dombraye
Assistant coach –
Technical coach –

Former managers
 Shaibu Amodu
 Kosta Papić
 Godwin Uwua
 Salisu Yusuf
 Ufere Nwankwo
 Mitko Dobrev (2009–??)
 John Zaki
 Garba Lawal
 Solomon Ogbeide
 Gbenga Ogunbote
 Kabiru Dogo

Notable players
Nwabali stanley
Akile Monday

References

External links
http://iorfaonline.blogspot.com/p/about-lobi-stars.html
Lobi signs 16 players at www.ngrguardiannews.com, accessed 20 November 2012
Iorfa vows to lift Lobi, as Board drops Kpakpor. Vanguard accessed 9 Nov. 2008
Lobi okays Dobrev, places 10 on transfer
Lobi Stars to be privatised next month (goal.com)
Nwankwo joins Lobi Stars
The bizarre refereeing that nearly claimed lives at Aper Aku Stadium (Sunday Trust)
LMC declares 2017/18 NPFL season concluded at Match Day 24

 
Football clubs in Nigeria
Association football clubs established in 1981
Benue State
1981 establishments in Nigeria
Sports clubs in Nigeria